The Santiago Times is a digital daily newspaper published in Santiago, Chile that reports news in Chile and other parts of Latin America. It was part of The Chilean Information Project (CHIP) reporting on environmental, social and economic issues within Chile. The newspaper's focus was environmental and social issues, giving particular attention to reporting on the Mapuche struggle and environmental concerns within Chile. The publication provides English and Spanish language media content for various organizations in Chile.

The Santiago Times was founded in 1990 as a personal hobby of its founder, Steve Anderson. It incorporated in 1995 and ceased publishing in November 2014. Both its Twitter and Facebook pages also ceased publishing in November 2014. 

After a hiatus of nearly two years, the website has come back online with a new look and a web articles dated July 7, 2016 where they are asking for contributors.

References

External links
 Official website
Steve Anderson - The German article about Santiago Times´ founder

Publications established in 1990
Publications disestablished in 2014
Publications established in 2016
English-language newspapers published in South America
Mass media in Santiago